Quetelet is a lunar impact crater, approximately 55 kilometers in diameter, that lies in the Moon's northern hemisphere, on the far side from the Earth. It lies to the southeast of the crater Schlesinger, and to the east of Von Zeipel. To the east of Quetelet is Perrine.

As is the case with many of the craters on the Moon, this feature has become worn and eroded by subsequent impacts. A small crater with a flat floor intrudes into the southwestern rim of Quetelet. Several small craterlets lie along the northern rim and the inner wall. The inner wall of Quetelet is narrower in the west than elsewhere, so that the level, relatively featureless interior floor is offset in that direction. The worn remains of a small craterlet lies along the southern inner wall.

Satellite craters 

By convention these features are identified on lunar maps by placing the letter on the side of the crater midpoint that is closest to Quetelet.

See also 
 1239 Queteleta, asteroid

References 

 
 
 
 
 
 
 
 
 
 
 
 

Impact craters on the Moon